Marty Read (December 18, 1949) is a Republican member of the Kansas House of Representatives, representing the newly redistricted 4th district (Mound City, Kansas in Linn County, Kansas), defeating Shirley Palmer.
He is an Auctioneer, Realtor, Rancher and a freshman Representative.  The American Conservative Union gave him a 100% evaluation in 2016.

Sources

External links
 Campaign Home Page
 Auction Business Website 
 State Page
 Ballotpedia
 Vote Smart 
 Open States
 Capwiz bio
 Follow the Money

Republican Party members of the Kansas House of Representatives
Living people
People from Mound City, Kansas
21st-century American politicians
1949 births